Chinese sailless submarine is a submarine built in the People’s Republic of China (PRC) for the People's Liberation Army Navy (PLAN).

First launched in 2018 at Jiangnan Shipyard, this submarine is rather unique in that it lacks the conning tower commonly found on submarines, but instead, has a tiny bump where the conning tower is supposed to located, and hence called “Chinese sailless submarine” by western analysts and observers. It's speculated that this Chinese sailless submarine is powered by lithium batteries, and used as a test bed for Chinese submarine technologies.

Specifications:
Length (ft): 150
Beam (ft): 15

References

Auxiliary ships of the People's Liberation Army Navy